The Russian Figure Skating Championships are a figure skating national championship held annually to determine the national champions of Russia. Medals are awarded in the disciplines of men's singles, ladies' singles, pair skating, and ice dancing on the senior level. The senior competition is typically held in late December. The junior national competition is held separately, generally in February.

The first Russian national competition was held on 5 March 1878 in Saint Petersburg, Russian Empire. It was won by V. I. Sreznevski. Official championships were held annually beginning in 1897. Aleksandr Panshin became the first official Russian national champion and won the event three more times until 1900. From 1924 to 1992, Russian skaters competed at the Soviet Championships. The Russian event returned in 1993.

Senior medalists

Men

Women

Pairs

Ice dancing

Junior medalists

References

External links
 Figure Skating Federation of Russia 
 fskate.ru 
 History at Skate Rambler 
 History at Sport Kharkov 

 
Figure skating national championships
Figure skating in Russia
National championships in Russia
1897 establishments in the Russian Empire
Recurring sporting events established in 1897